Anania amaniensis is a moth in the family Crambidae. It was described by Koen V. N. Maes in 1997. It is found in Cameroon, Tanzania and Uganda.

References

Moths described in 1997
Pyraustinae
Moths of Africa